Biały Bór (formerly ) is a town in Szczecinek County, West Pomeranian Voivodeship, Poland, with 2,226 inhabitants as of December 2021.

History

The settlement was founded in the 13th century. It was part of Poland, until the Teutonic invasion in the early 14th century. Located at a formerly important crossroad, the Teutonic Knights built a fortification here, and in 1382 the settlement received Kulm law town rights. The town's development was stopped by a large fire in 1408. No traces remain of the castle, but remnants of the medieval city wall have been incorporated in some later houses.

During the Thirteen Years' War it was recaptured by the Poles in 1461, and it was confirmed as part of Poland in 1466. Since then it was part of the Pomeranian Voivodeship until the First Partition of Poland in 1772, when it was annexed by Prussia, and subsequently from 1871 it was part of Germany.

Up until the 20th century, the town economy consisted mostly of fishing, agriculture, crafts and local trade. It was the centre of a cloth manufacturing industry from the 16th century until the 19th century, when it had to close due to competition from more modern industries. A railway connection to the town was established in 1878. While most of Gdańsk Pomerania was reintegrated with Poland after the country regained independence in 1918, the town was one of the few which remained within Germany and was included in the newly established province, provocatively named towards Poles the Frontier March of Posen-West Prussia. In 1939, the town had 2,292 inhabitants. The town had a Jewish community and a small synagogue prior to World War II and the Holocaust. The town was reintegrated with Poland in 1945.

From 1950 to 1998, the town belonged to the Koszalin Voivodeship.

Transport
There is a railway station in Biały Bór.

Notable residents
 Georg Ludwig Rudolf Maercker (1865-1924), World War I general
 Karl Ruß (1833-1899), ornithologist

References

External links

 Official website 
 Jewish Community of Biały Bór on Virtual Shtetl

Cities and towns in West Pomeranian Voivodeship
Szczecinek County
Kulm law